Rock Mills is an unincorporated community in Rappahannock County, in the U.S. state of Virginia.

References

Unincorporated communities in Virginia
Unincorporated communities in Rappahannock County, Virginia